BBZ may refer to:
 Bluebird Aviation
 A retired ISO 639-3 for Babalia Creole Arabic